John Stapylton Habgood, Baron Habgood,  (23 June 1927 – 6 March 2019) was a British Anglican bishop, academic, and life peer. He was Bishop of Durham from 1973 to 1983, and Archbishop of York from 18 November 1983 to 1995. In 1995, he was made a life peer and so continued to serve in the House of Lords after stepping down as archbishop. He took a leave of absence in later life, and in 2011 was one of the first peers to explicitly retire from the Lords.

Early life and career
Habgood was born on 23 June 1927, the son of Dr Arthur Henry Habgood and his wife Vera. He was educated at Eton, King's College, Cambridge and Ripon College Cuddesdon. A University Demonstrator in Pharmacology from 1950, he became a Fellow of King's College, Cambridge in 1952.

In 1961 Habgood married Rosalie Mary Anne Boston (died 2016); he had two daughters and two sons, including Francis Habgood, formerly Chief Constable of Thames Valley Police.

Early ministry
Habgood was ordained in the Church of England as a deacon in 1954 and as a priest in 1955.  From 1954 to 1956, he was a curate at St Mary Abbots Church, Kensington, London. From 1956 to 1962 he was Vice-Principal of Westcott House theological college in Cambridge. From 1962 to 1967 he was Rector of St John's Church, Jedburgh. In 1967 he became Principal of Queen's College, Edgbaston, a theological college, until his appointment to the episcopate.

He was consecrated a bishop and appointed as Bishop of Durham in 1973. He was passed over by Margaret Thatcher for appointment as Bishop of London in 1981.

Archbishop of York
Habgood was elevated to Archbishop of York on 18 November 1983. The other name put forward for the Prime Minister's consideration was that of former England cricketer, David Sheppard, by then Bishop of Liverpool. Sheppard's socialist views - he later sat in the Lords as a Labour Peer - did not commend him to Thatcher. As an archbishop, Habgood was made a Privy Counsellor in 1983.

As Archbishop of York, Habgood was seen as a leader in keeping more conservative Anglicans within the church during growing divisions over the issue of women's ordination to the priesthood. He supported the ordination of women to the priesthood, arguing that God is neither male nor female. He also supported accommodating those who did not, and so introduced provincial episcopal visitors to provide pastoral care and oversight to laity, clergy, and parishes who could not accept women priests. Habgood retired as Archbishop of York in August 1995.

Canterbury
When Robert Runcie announced his retirement as Archbishop of Canterbury in 1990, Habgood was regarded as one of the favourites to succeed him. The religious journalist Clifford Longley described him as "the outstanding churchman of his generation", although noting that Habgood had described himself as too old. As preparations for the selection of the new archbishop began, Habgood gave a television interview stating that he was interested in being considered as "if I believed that this is what the church really wanted and if I believed that this is what God really wanted I would be under a strong obligation to say yes." At the same time it was reported that Habgood was not popular among those close to the Prime Minister, Margaret Thatcher, who would make the actual recommendation to the Queen. Habgood had also attracted criticism inside and outside the Church for his behaviour during the 1987 Crockford's Clerical Directory preface controversy.

At the beginning of May a report in the Sunday Correspondent stated that four candidates were under active consideration: Habgood, David Sheppard (Bishop of Liverpool), Colin James (Bishop of Winchester) and John Waine (Bishop of Chelmsford). Habgood declined to take up the automatic place he could have had on the Crown Appointments Commission, which would select the two names to be given to the Prime Minister. He was endorsed in a leader in The Times on 10 July 1990. On 25 July it was announced that the next Archbishop of Canterbury would be George Carey, the Bishop of Bath and Wells. Habgood described him as "a good choice", adding that "there is a little human bit in anybody that likes the top job, but that is a very small part in my feelings. In my heart of hearts I didn't really want the job. If it had come five years ago I might have thought differently but you slow up and it is an enormously tiring job."

House of Lords
From his appointment as Bishop of Durham in 1973 to his retirement as Archbishop of York in 1995, Habgood sat in the House of Lords as a Lord Spiritual. This was due to the senior rankings of the two bishoprics in the Church of England, which each granted an automatic seat in the Lords. He voted against Section 28 of the Local Government Act 1988 which banned local authorities from "promoting homosexuality" and state schools from teaching the "acceptability of homosexuality as a pretended family relationship": it was later repealed in 2000 in Scotland and in 2003 in the rest of the UK.

Habgood was created a life peer as Baron Habgood, of Calverton in the County of Buckinghamshire on 8 September 1995, allowing him to continue to sit in the House of Lords as a Lord Temporal. He sat as a crossbencher, rather than join a political party. Later in his life he ceased attending the Lords and took leave of absence; on 3 October 2011 he became one of the first two peers to formally and permanently retire from membership under a newly instituted procedure that was created before permanent retirement achieved full legal recognition under the House of Lords Reform Act 2014.

Religion and science
Habgood was a member and past president of The Science and Religion Forum. He wrote in this area, e.g., his book Truths in Tension: New Perspectives on Religion and Science (1965). Another example of his work in this area is "Faith, Science and the Future: the Conference Sermon", which was given at the World Council of Churches' conference on Faith, Science and the Future held on the MIT campus (12–24 July 1979). An early 21st-century example is his review of Ronald L. Numbers's book The Creationists, which Habgood titled "The creation of Creationism: Today's brand of Protestant extremism should worry theologians as well as scientists".

Books

Religion and Science (1964; 1965 U.S. publication retitled to Truths in Tension: New Perspectives on Religion and Science)
 A Cavendish Professor of Physics and Nobel Laureate, Nevill Mott, has cited this book:
"I am impressed too by the point of view of the present Archbishop of York (John Habgood, Science and Religion, [London: Hodder and Stoughton, 1964]), that to understand the Bible we must try to enter into the belief patterns of the period".
A Working Faith (1980)
Church and Nation in a Secular Age (1983)
Confessions of a Conservative Liberal (1988)
Making Sense (1993)
Faith and Uncertainty (1997)
Being a Person (1998)
Varieties of Unbelief (2000)
The Concept of Nature (2002)

Arms

See also 

List of science and religion scholars

References

External links
 Biography – John Habgood, on the Gifford Lectures site. 2000–2001 lectures are online.
 John Habgood – God debates at Cambridge website
 Contributions in the House of Lords
"The Untidiness of Integration: John Stapylton Habgood". Kevin Seybold, Volume 57 Number 2. June 2005. PSCF
 

 
 

1927 births
2019 deaths
Bishops of Durham
Archbishops of York
Crossbench life peers
Members of the Privy Council of the United Kingdom
20th-century Anglican archbishops
Ordained peers
People educated at Eton College
Alumni of King's College, Cambridge
Fellows of King's College, Cambridge
Alumni of Ripon College Cuddesdon
Staff of Westcott House, Cambridge
Principals of Queen's College, Birmingham
Life peers created by Elizabeth II